Swayamsiddha is a 2010 Odia film directed by Sudhanshu Sahu with a screenplay and dialogue by Dilip Choudhury, produced by Prabhat Ranjan Mallik, and starring Siddhanta Mahapatra and Yukta Inderlal Mookhey. The film focuses on the implications for the young mass adopting to Maoist insurgency and their sustained alienation from the mainstream as a result. Geo-strategic importance of changing the minds of young people adopting terrorism through love and affection. The film traces the crisis from social trauma to unfair state system encouraging Mao-Naxal insurgency in Odisha.

Plot

Cast
Siddhanta Mahapatra    as Digvijay
Yukta Inderlal Mookhey         as Shreya / Swayamsidha
Sunil Kumar           as Raj
Aparajita Mohanty		
Anita Das
Shweta Acharya		
Dushmant
Pradyumna Lenka	
Pintu Nanda		
Prasanna Kumar Patasani	
Matru Prasad	
Sarojini Rout

Filming location
The film Swayamsidha in fact was shot under very challenging and turbulent situations. Most of part of the film are filming at Naxalite-Maoist insurgency areas in Koraput district of Orissa state.

Controversy
As the main co-star of the film Siddhanta Mahapatra is an M.P. and belongs to the ruling party Biju Janata Dal of Orissa portrays himself as Maoist leader in the film, the opposition parties in the state went on strikes and demanded ban on release of the film. Hundreds of  Congress  activists were arrested  for disrupting the screening of the film.

Music
The music of the film composed  by Swarup Nayak.
The tracks from the film include:

Awards
 National Award Best Actor in Negative Performance- Sidhant Mahapatra
 Mohan Sundar Deb Goswami Award
 Odisha State Film Award for Best Film
 2nd Etv Oriya Film Awards 2011 Best Actor Siddhanta Mahapatra
 Special Jury Award of 2010 in 2nd Tarang Cine Awards 2011
 Best Cinematographer of 2010 Odisha State Film Award for Best Photography and 2nd Tarang Cine Awards 2011
 Best Director  of 2010 in 2nd Tarang Cine Awards 2011
 Best Editor  of 2010 in 2nd Tarang Cine Awards 2011
 Best Screenplay  of 2010 in State Awards, 2nd Tarang Cine Awards 2011
 Best sound design  of 2010 in State Awards, 2nd Tarang Cine Awards 2011
 Best Odia Film of 2010 in Etv Oriya Film Awards 2011
 Best Director of 2010 in Etv Oriya Film Awards 2011
 Best cinematographer of 2010 in Etv Oriya Film Awards 2011

References

External links 

 

2010 films
Films scored by Swarup Nayak
2010s Odia-language films
Films directed by Sudhanshu Sahu